Juana Brava is a Chilean television series created by Ignacio Arnold and Nimrod Amitai and produced and aired by Televisión Nacional de Chile (TVN) during the second half of 2015. The series takes place in the fictional town of San Fermín, inspired by the Chilean town of Tiltil, and focuses on the abuse of power and the struggle of a simple woman to change a complex system dominated by large and powerful entities. It highlights conflicts between citizens, social problems, corruption, and the struggle for rights.

The series was originally titled The Mayor and was to be produced by Mega after the project received CLP$379,092,972 (US in 2013) in funding from the National Television Council in 2013. Mega wanted an in-house team to develop the scripts, which Arnold and Amitai felt would lessen the quality of the product, leading them to end the partnership and take the project to TVN instead.

The series premiered on October 4, 2015.

Plot 
Juana Bravo (Elisa Zulueta) is a 33-year-old woman who, after 15 years in the capital, is forced to return to her hometown, the fictional San Fermín, where her father (Alejandro Trejo) is the mayor. When she comes back she realizes that things are not working properly and the town has become the site of landfills, prisons, and polluting industries that nobody else wants in their neighborhood. After discovering the irregularities, she faces both a corrupt system and family challenges. She is an idealistic and somewhat impulsive woman who works hard to gain the support of those who live in the town, believing she can change the system. But in her struggle she neglects her 16-year-old son, Diego (Lucas Balmaceda), who goes from being naive and lonely to an anti-establishment rebel.

Cast 
 Elisa Zulueta as Juana Bravo
 Alejandro Trejo as Ambrosio Bravo
 Lux Pascal (credited as Lucas Balmaceda) as Diego Bravo
 Gastón Salgado as Fidel Carmona
 Emilia Noguera as Paula "Poli" Montejo
 Daniel Guillón as Tomás
 Nelson Brodt as José "Pepe" Gallardo
 Paulina Urrutia as Hilda Salgado
 Willy Semler as Bernardo Maureira
 Andrés Skoknic as Darío Alcázar
 Mauricio Diócares as Jimmy
 Eyal Meyer as Esteban Quiroz
 Santiago Tupper as Gregorio Mancilla
 Daniela Palavecino as Marisol Tapia
 Ángela Lineros as "La Negra"
 Jaime Milla as Dylan
 Gonzalo Araya as Alexis
 Leonardo Bertolini as Pito
 Estrella Ortiz as Victoria "Vicky" Leiva
 Aldo Bernales as Carlos
 Mateo Iribarren as Mayor Toro

Guests 
 Daniel Muñoz as Charles
 Emilio Edwards as "El Turco"
 Alison Mandel as Isidora
 Luz María Yacometti as Albinia
 Ernesto Gutiérrez as Jara
 Pelusa Troncoso as María, abuela de Victoria
 Marcelo Maldonado as Rodrigo Núñez
 Nicolás de Terán as Ronaldo
 Máx Corvalán as José
 Patricia Velasco as Marcela "Chelita" de Maureira
 Cristián Gajardo as Rubén
 Gabriela Arancibia as Maraya
 Rodrigo Lisboa as "El Gato"
 Benjamín Hidalgo as Carlanga
 Rafael Ahumada as Don Pancho
 Ariel Mateluna as Ramiro
 Patricia Pacheco as Maria Alejandra
 Paulina Eguiluz as Luisa
 Gilda Maureira as Doña Humilde
 Macarena Gajardo as Silvia de Mancilla
 Cristián Gajardo as Cabo Cáceres
 Agustín Moya as Nibaldo
 Elvis Fuentes as Nicolás Islas
 Ramón González
 Natalia Aragonese as Leo, madre de Victoria
 Catherine Mazoyer as Periodista 24 Horas
 Eduardo Cumar as Señor Lozano
 Mónica Pérez (cameo)

Awards and nominations

References

External links 
 Official web site (Spanish)

2015 in Chilean television
Televisión Nacional de Chile original programming